The 1928 Coupe de France Final was a football match held at Stade Olympique Yves-du-Manoir, Colombes on May 6, 1928, that saw Red Star Olympique defeat CA Paris 3–1 thanks to goals by Paul Wartel, Brenna Egil Lund and Juste Brouzes.

Match details

See also
Coupe de France 1927-1928

External links
Coupe de France results at Rec.Sport.Soccer Statistics Foundation
Report on French federation site

Coupe
1928
Coupe De France Final 1928
Sport in Hauts-de-Seine
Coupe de France Final
Coupe de France Final